The Cerebral Palsy Games (or CP Games) are a multi-sport competition for athletes with a disability, which under the former name of the International Stoke Mandeville Games were the forerunner of the Paralympic Games. The competition has been formerly known as the International Cerebral Palsy Games or the Stoke Mandeville Games. Since the 1990s the Games are organized by the organisation Cerebral Palsy International Sports and Recreation Association (CPISRA), so they called also CPISRA World Games.

The Games were originally held in 1976 by neurologist Sir Ludwig Guttmann, who organized a sporting competition involving World War II veterans with spinal cord injuries at the Stoke Mandeville Hospital rehabilitation facility in Aylesbury, England, taking place concurrently with the first post-war Summer Olympics in London. In 1952, the Netherlands joined in the event, creating the first international sports competition for disabled people. In 1960, the Ninth Stoke Mandeville Games were held in Rome, Italy, following that year's Olympic Games. These are considered to be the first Paralympic Games. The 2012 Paralympic mascot Mandeville was named after Stoke Mandeville Hospital.

While the Paralympic Games evolved to include athletes from all disability groups, the Stoke Mandeville games continued to be organized as a multi-sport event for wheelchair athletes. Games were held annually in Aylesbury under the direction of the International Stoke Mandeville Games Federation (ISMGF), which became the International Stoke Mandeville Wheelchair Sports Federation (ISMWSF).

Games

Results

2015

 CPISRA World Games Nottingham 2015

2018
Over 600 participants from 30 countries in 5 sports:

Sports
 Athletics
 Boccia
 CP Football
 Swimming
 Wheelchair Slalom

Results
 http://cpisra.org/new-site/wp-content/uploads/2019/05/para-athletics-thursday.pdf
 http://cpisra.org/new-site/wp-content/uploads/2019/03/para-athletics-friday.pdf
 http://cpisra.org/new-site/wp-content/uploads/2019/05/para-athletics-saturday.pdf
 http://cpisra.org/new-site/wp-content/uploads/2019/05/boccia-pools-individual.pdf
 http://cpisra.org/new-site/wp-content/uploads/2019/05/boccia-pairs-teams.pdf
 http://cpisra.org/new-site/wp-content/uploads/2019/05/boccia-final-classification.pdf
 http://cpisra.org/new-site/wp-content/uploads/2019/05/cp-football-results.pdf
 http://cpisra.org/new-site/wp-content/uploads/2019/05/IFCPF-Female-CP-Football-Match-Report.pdf
 http://cpisra.org/new-site/wp-content/uploads/2019/05/para-swimming-session1.pdf
 http://cpisra.org/new-site/wp-content/uploads/2019/05/para-swimming-session2.pdf
 http://cpisra.org/new-site/wp-content/uploads/2019/05/para-swimming-session3.pdf
 http://cpisra.org/new-site/wp-content/uploads/2019/05/wheelchair-slalom-erasmus.pdf
 http://cpisra.org/new-site/wp-content/uploads/2019/05/wheelchair-slalom-official.pdf

2023
TBD.

See also 
 Cerebral Palsy International Sports and Recreation Association
 International Federation of Cerebral Palsy Football
 CP football
 IWAS World Games

References

External links
CPISRA World Games from the Cerebral Palsy International Sports and Recreation Association (CPISRA) website
CPISRA World Games Nottingham from the Cerebral Palsy Sport (cpsport) website

 
Disabled multi-sport events
Recurring sporting events established in 1978
Cerebral palsy and other paralytic syndromes